Joseph I (Joseph Jacob Ignaz Johann Anton Eustachius; 26 July 1678 – 17 April 1711) was Holy Roman Emperor and ruler of the Austrian Habsburg monarchy from 1705 until his death in 1711. He was the eldest son of Emperor Leopold I from his third wife, Eleonor Magdalene of Neuburg. Joseph was crowned King of Hungary at the age of nine in 1687 and was elected King of the Romans at the age of eleven in 1690. He succeeded to the thrones of Bohemia and the Holy Roman Empire when his father died.

Joseph continued the War of the Spanish Succession, begun by his father against Louis XIV of France, in an attempt to make his younger brother Charles (later Emperor Charles VI) King of Spain. In the process, however, owing to the victories won by his military commander, Prince Eugene of Savoy, he did succeed in establishing Austrian hegemony over Italy. Joseph also had to contend with a protracted revolt in Hungary, fomented by Louis XIV. Neither conflict was resolved until the Treaty of Utrecht, after his death.

His motto was Amore et Timore (Latin for "Through Love and Fear").

Early life

Born in Vienna, Joseph was educated strictly by Charles Theodore, Prince of Salm, and became a good linguist. Perhaps due to the influence of his formerly Protestant tutor he was a less devout Catholic than his parents and other relatives and developed into an adherent of the early Enlightenment. He had two great enthusiasms: music and hunting.

Although Joseph was the first son and child born of his parents' marriage, he was his father's third son and seventh child. Previously, Leopold had been married to Infanta Margaret Theresa of Spain, who had given him four children, one of whom survived infancy. He then married Claudia Felicitas of Austria, who gave him two short-lived daughters. Thus, Joseph had six half-siblings. In 1684, the six-year-old Archduke had his first portrait painted by Benjamin Block. At the age of nine, on 9 December 1687, he was crowned King of Hungary; and at the age of eleven, on 23 January 1690, King of the Romans.

Military service
In 1702, at the outbreak of the War of the Spanish Succession, Joseph saw his only military service. He joined the Imperial General, Louis William, Margrave of Baden-Baden, in the Siege of Landau.

Holy Roman Emperor

Prior to his ascension, Joseph had surrounded himself with reform-hungry advisors and the young court of Vienna was ambitious in the elaboration of innovative plans. He was described as a "forward-looking ruler". The large number of privy councillors was reduced and attempts were made to make the bureaucracy more efficient. Measures were taken to modernize the central bodies and a certain success was achieved in stabilizing the chronic Habsburg finances. Joseph also endeavoured to strengthen his position in the Holy Roman Empire – as a means of strengthening Austria’s standing as a great power. When he sought to lay claim to imperial rights in Italy and gain territories for the Habsburgs, he even risked a military conflict with the Pope over the duchy of Mantua. Joseph I was threatened with excommunication by Pope Clement XI on 16 June 1699.

In Hungary, Joseph had inherited the kuruc rebellion from his father Leopold I: once again, nobles in Transylvania (Siebenbürgen) had risen against Habsburg rule, even advancing for a time as far as Vienna. Although Joseph was compelled to take military action, he refrained – unlike his predecessors – from seeking to teach his subjects a lesson by executing the leaders. Instead, he agreed to a compromise peace, which in the long term facilitated the integration of Hungary into the Habsburg domains. It was his good fortune to govern the Austrian dominions and to be head of the Empire, during the years in which his trusted general, Prince Eugene of Savoy, either acting alone in Italy or with the Duke of Marlborough in Germany and Flanders, was beating the armies of Louis XIV of France. During the whole of his reign, Hungary was disturbed by the conflict with Francis Rákóczi II, who eventually took refuge in the Ottoman Empire. The emperor reversed many of the authoritarian measures of his father, thus helping to placate opponents. He began the attempts to settle the question of the Austrian inheritance by a pragmatic sanction, which was continued by his brother Charles VI.
In 1710, Joseph extended his father's edict of outlawry against the Romani (Gypsies) in the Habsburg lands. Per Leopold, any Romani who entered the kingdom was to be declared an outlaw by letters patent. If the same person returned to Bohemia a second time, they were to be "treated with all possible severity". Joseph ordered that in the Kingdom of Bohemia they were to have their right ears cut off; in the March of Moravia, the left ear was to be cut off; in Austria, they would be branded on the back with a branding iron, representing the gallows. These mutilations were to enable the authorities to identify Romani who had been outlawed and returned. Joseph's edict specified "that all adult males were to be hanged without trial, whereas women and young males were to be flogged and banished forever." Officials who failed to enforce the edict could be fined 100 Reichsthaler. Helping Romani was punishable by a half-year's forced labor. "Mass killings" of Romani were reported as a result.

Death

During the smallpox epidemic of 1711, which killed Louis, le Grand Dauphin and three siblings of the future Holy Roman Emperor Francis I, Joseph became infected. He died on 17 April in the Hofburg Palace. He had previously promised his wife to stop having affairs, should he survive.

The Emperor was buried in the Imperial Crypt, resting place of the majority of the Habsburgs. His funeral took place on 20 April, in tomb no. 35 in Karl's Vault. His tomb was designed by Johann Lukas von Hildebrandt, decorated with pictures of various battles from the War of Spanish Succession. Josefstadt (the eighth district of Vienna) is named for Joseph.

Marriage and lack of heirs
On 24 February 1699, he married Wilhelmine Amalia of Brunswick-Lüneburg in Vienna. They had three children and their only son died of hydrocephalus before his first birthday. Joseph had a passion for love affairs (none of which resulted in illegitimate children) and he caught a sexually transmittable disease, probably syphilis, which he passed on to his wife while they were trying to produce a new heir. This incident rendered her sterile. Their father, who was still alive during these events, made Joseph and his brother Charles sign the Mutual Pact of Succession, under which Joseph's daughters would have precedence over Charles's daughters, in case neither fathered a son. This ruling, ignored in the accession of Charles's daughter Maria Theresa, led to the War of Austrian Succession.

Issue

Ancestors

References

Bibliography
 C. W. Ingrao, In Quest and Crisis: Emperor Joseph I and the Habsburg Monarchy (1979)
 F. Krones von Marchiand, Grundriss der Oesterreichischen Geschichte (1882)
 F. Wagner, Historia Josephi Caesaris (1746)
 J. C. Herchenhahn, Geschichte der Regierung Kaiser Josephs I (1786–1789)
 C. van Noorden, Europäische Geschichte im achtzehnten Jahrhundert (1870–1882).

External links

 
 Joseph I.: "Regina coeli"
 Joseph I (Holy Roman Empire) - MSN Encarta  (Archived 2009-10-31)

Regnal titles

1678 births
1711 deaths
18th-century Holy Roman Emperors
18th-century archdukes of Austria
17th-century Kings of the Romans
Nobility from Vienna
Dukes of Teschen
Joseph I, Holy Roman Emperor
Grand Masters of the Order of the Golden Fleece
Knights of the Golden Fleece
Deaths from smallpox
Infectious disease deaths in Austria
Burials at the Imperial Crypt
Burials at St. Stephen's Cathedral, Vienna
17th-century House of Habsburg
Dukes of Carniola
Sons of emperors
 
Children of Leopold I, Holy Roman Emperor